Carta blanca (White card) is a TVE television programme, developed by Santiago Tabernero, written by María Carrión, Borja Echebarría and Paco Tomás, produced by Gloria Concostrina and broadcast by TVE2 and TVE Internacional, in which a guest selects several other guests for interviews and/or performances.

Programmes

External links

RTVE shows
Spanish television talk shows